Cristo Rey Jesuit High School (CRJ) is an independent, Jesuit, co-educational, college preparatory school in Baltimore, Maryland, Roman Catholic Archdiocese of Baltimore. It is part of the Cristo Rey Network of high schools, the original being Cristo Rey Jesuit High School in Chicago. CRJ  opened in August 2007 and graduated its first class in June 2011. In partnership with the East Coast Jesuits and the Baltimore business community, the school targets lower income families of religious, racial, and ethnic diversity.

History
In 1996, the Jesuits in Chicago founded the first Cristo Rey school to provide a college preparatory education to the children in the Pilsen/Little Village neighborhood. Families there wanted a better option for their children, and the Jesuits believed that education was the way out of poverty. The initial stumbling block of how to pay for a college prep education was resolved through having students earn part of their tuition through the Corporate Internship Program. That school was so successful that it became a model for other cities. The Cristo Rey Network was formed and in 2018 supported 36 schools across the country, including Cristo Rey Jesuit here in Fells Point.

Cristo Rey Jesuit is housed in the former Holy Rosary School, which was an elementary school for the mostly Polish neighborhood around its South Chester Street location. CRJ currently enrolls 350 students in grades nine through twelve, representing 25 zip codes and more than 50 middle schools across the city.

Cristo Rey Jesuit is sponsored by the Jesuit East Province Jesuits, which in 1852 founded what have become Loyola University Maryland and Loyola Blakefield. In 1993 they opened St. Ignatius Loyola Academy, a tuition-free middle school for disadvantaged young men from under-served neighborhoods in Baltimore. Now Cristo Rey Baltimore serves mostly low-income families, and tuition is held to $2,500 per year or less.

Cristo Rey Jesuit's first commencement took place on June 18, 2011, at the Roman Catholic Cathedral of Mary Our Queen. Seventy-eight young men and women formed the first graduating class and all were accepted into college, as has continued to be the case.

Activities 
Clubs sponsored by the school include the National Honor Society, Gospel Choir, Student Government, Art Club, Yearbook (The Buzz), T.R.E.N.D. (Talent, Respect and Education Never Dies), Many Men, and Anime Club.

All students are required to do at least 10 hours of community service each year. A notable project taken on by students, in conjunction with their social justice course, was research on water pollution and water billing; they studied this precious resource in line with Pope Francis' encyclical on the environment.

Athletic teams sponsored by the school include boys' and girls' soccer and basketball, boys' lacrosse and girls' softball. There is also a performing Step Team.

See also

List of Jesuit secondary schools in the United States
National Catholic Educational Association

References

Further reading
 Kearney, G. R. More Than a Dream: The Cristo Rey Story: How One School's Vision Is Changing the World. Chicago, Ill: Loyola Press, 2008.

External links
 Fr. John P. Foley honored with Presidential Citizen's Medal
60 minutes
Cristo Rey Featured in WashPost column by George Will
 Boston Globe - With sense of purpose, students cut class for a day 
 Bill & Melinda Gates Foundation - Success of Innovative Urban Catholic School Sparks Major Investment
Aljazeera

Articles 
 “Under Armour signs local high school", Baltimore Sun, Oct. 1, 2015
 “ 'Ignatian Solidarity Network, Sept. 29, 2015
 “Cristo Rey students to see Pope in Philadelphia,” WBAL-TV, Sept. 23, 2015
 "100 women march for immigration reform,” Baltimore Sun, Sept. 19, 2015
 "Why Pope Francis should come to Baltimore,” Catholic Review, Sept. 14, 2015
 "Baltimore's Future: Travis Henschen and Lemuel Bourne," WYPR, August 27, 2015
 “How Jesuit Education Changed My Life,” Association of Jesuit Colleges and Universities, Aug. 21, 2015
 "Innovative internship program boosts Baltimore, students," Baltimore Sun, August 11, 2015
 "2015 Full-scholarship winner appreciates extracurricular learning at Cristo Rey," Catholic Review, June 18, 2015
 “Kids who can’t afford an education: 100% college acceptance rate,” Business Insider, April 30, 2015 
 “Cristo Rey performers step out of comfort zones,” Catholic Review, May 14, 2015 
 "Baltimore: We wait, We pray, We keep dreaming big," Ignatian Solidarity Network, April 29, 2015 
 "The high school corporate America built," Al Jazeera America, April 2, 2015
 "Jewish-backed Baltimore Catholic high," Jewish Times, February 19, 2015
 " Extra Attention Keeps Students On Path to College," WYPR, June 20, 2014

Catholic secondary schools in Maryland
Educational institutions established in 2007
Jesuit high schools in the United States
Cristo Rey Network
2007 establishments in Maryland
Poverty-related organizations